T-Square (formerly known as The Square), stylized in all-uppercase T-SQUARE, is a Japanese jazz fusion band formed in 1976.  They became famous in the late 1970s and early 1980s along with other Japanese jazz bands. They are known for songs such as "Truth", "Japanese Soul Brothers", "Takarajima", "Omens of Love", among others.

During the first years simply The SQUARE was printed on the frontsides of their albums. After the renaming of the band to T-Square the imprint changed to T-SQUARE (all in Capital letters) and their typical logo became a capital letter T printed over a red square. During the years with the changing names of the band the logo got modified several times, reflecting the changing band names such as T-Square alpha (where an α sign got added to the logo), T-Square plus where the text "plus" was added centered next to the T in smaller letters.

"Truth" has been used as the theme for Fuji Television's Formula One coverage from 1989 to 2000 and since 2012. A special arrangement, "Truth 21c", was used as the theme for Japan's F1 2001 and 2002, respectively, and other remixes were used from 2003 to 2006.

History

The Square (1976–1988)

In 1976, the band started as a small jazz fusion group in Meiji University with a very basic line-up, made of bassist Yuhji Nakamura, guitarist Masahiro Andoh, pianist Jun Hakamazuka and drummer Shunichi Harada. According to Masahiro Andoh, the band's name was based on Madison Square Garden. Hakamazuka and Harada were replaced by Junko Miyagi on keyboards and Michael S. Kawai on drums, and a young, debuting Takeshi Itoh joining in on saxophone and flutes, in 1977.

With backing guitarist Yuhji Mikuriya, keyboardist Shiro Sagisu and percussionist Kiyohiko Senba joining in 1978, the band was then named "The Square". It had a semi-generic, disco-type sound. Lead saxophonist Takeshi Itoh adopted the Lyricon as a side instrument. The Square would then begin a tradition of writing one to three songs with the Lyricon in every new album thereafter. As the years progressed, the number of members had dwindled from eight members (two keyboardists, two guitarists, a drummer, a Percussionist, a sax player and a bassist) to five (a drummer, a keyboardist, a guitarist, a sax player and a bassist). 

The group's sound had also evolved to a more rock-oriented music when Junko Miyagi and Michael S. Kawai were replaced by drummer Jun Aoyama (better known as Tatsuro Yamashita's drummer from 1979 to 2003) and Prism (ja) keyboardist Daisaku Kume. The band would also have vocalists, with Rockoon being the first of two albums to prominently feature one. Jun Aoyama was later replaced by Eiji Shimizu on drums and Yuhji Nakamura was replaced by bassist Toyoyuki Tanaka in 1981.

In 1982, Tohru Hasebe replaced Shimizu and Hirotaka Izumi joined the band, replacing Kume. Izumi eventually became the second-longest tenured keyboardist over 15 years with T-Square (1982 to 1997). This would be the band's first consistent line-up, lasting until late 1985. Hiroyuki Noritake would then replace Hasebe on drums in 1986 as their first long-term drummer. By the start of 1987, Mitsuru Sutoh replaced Toyoyuki Tanaka on bass, being the first long-term bassist in the group. Takeshi Itoh would go on to swap his Lyricon for an EWI before the band made their first release in the United States.

Their first performance in the United States was at the Cat Club in New York City in December 1987 and it was released on video in early 1988. Before they made their way to the Roxy Theatre (West Hollywood) in Los Angeles, they realized there was already a group from California called "The Squares". Thus, the band changed their name to "T-Square".

T-Square (1988–2000)

The band's performance at the Roxy marked their first live album as T-Square, and in 1989, they released their first studio album under that name, Wave. The band would also appear alongside Ottottrio (with guitarist Hirokuni Korekata) and Casiopea in The Super Fusion that same year. In 1990, saxophonist Masato Honda debuted with them as a backing saxophonist on the album T-Square Live (featuring F-1 Grand Prix Theme). By the end of 1990, Takeshi Itoh left the group to pursue a solo career in the US, and Honda replaced him in 1991. Honda also composed the opening track from T-Square's New-S album, "Megalith". After the release of the Blue in Red album in 1997, Honda left the group to pursue his solo career. Takahiro Miyazaki would replace him. At the same time, Hirotaka Izumi left T-Square and was replaced by Tadashi Namba. Namba played keyboards on the theme song from Gran Turismo, "Moon Over The Castle" (from Masahiro's solo album Andy's, released in 1996) as well as the T-Square arrangement of the song, called "Knight's Song", from Blue in Red. The group and all former and (at the time) current members played at Yaon de Asobu for their 20th anniversary that same year. This is one of the last T-Square performances in which Masato Honda was involved (unlike Miyazaki and Itoh, Honda didn't participate in the anniversary concerts in 2003, 2008, 2013, and 2018). In 1999, Tadashi Namba was replaced by Keiji Matsumoto. The new line-up of Miyazaki, Noritake, Sutoh, Matsumoto and Andoh was kept until the group's brief disbandment in mid-2000.

Trio The Square, T-Square Plus (2000–2002)

In mid-2000, the band was divided into T-Square (original and long-term guitarist Masahiro Andoh, returning saxophonist Takeshi Itoh and session musicians) and Trio The Square (bassist Mitsuru Sutoh, drummer Hiroyuki Noritake and keyboardist Keiji Matsumoto). This trio was the main reason for why T-Square had to employ session musicians to record with the exception of the Friendship Live performance. The performance had ex-long term drummer, Hiroyuki Noritake, along with support bassist Kiyoshi Murakami and keyboardist Keizoh Kawano, the latter of whom would become the longest tenured keyboardist over 20 years with T-Square. T-Square changed its name again to T-Square Plus. Former guitarist Yuhji Mikuriya as well as former Seikima-II bassist Shunsuke "Xenon" Ishikawa and session keyboardist Takehiro Kawabe joined them briefly in 2002. After that, the band dropped the "Plus" from their name, but continued to use session musicians until 2003.

T Comes Back (2003)

In 2003, T-Square released the album Spirits under their original name "The Square", and retained some of their original members (partly due to T-Square's 25th anniversary that year) and kept their newcomer, Keizoh Kawano. The line-up was Itoh, Noritake, Sutoh, Kawano, Izumi and Andoh. They released another album, T Comes Back, that featured new arrangements of some of their best known songs.

In 2004, the group changed their name again to T-Square, and, Katsuji Morioka joined and replaced Mitsuru Sutoh on bass. A year later, Morioka was replaced by Shingo Tanaka as support bassist. Also in 2004, Keizoh Kawano became an official keyboardist. Drummer Satoshi Bandoh replaced Hiroyuki Noritake in the same year. T-Square's original drummer, Michael S. Kawai, returned as a behind-the-scenes percussionist and producer from 2004 to 2008.

T-Square Super Band/Super Special Band (2008–2009)
The band briefly changed their name to T-Square Super Band, to promote their 30th anniversary tour.  Most former T-Square members were involved in recording their new album, Wonderful Days, adding even more former members. This began in 2008 after the end of their Wonderful Days tour. After, the group changed its name to T-Square Super Special Band and played on Yaon de Asobu for their 30th anniversary show. This show was released in February 2009 as The Square ~ T-Square since 1978: 30th Anniversary Festival.

Self-covers (2009–2012)

With the release of their 2009 album Discoveries, T-Square dropped "Super Special Band" from their name and cut the members down to keyboardist Keizoh Kawano, drummer Satoshi Bandoh, returning support bassist Shingo Tanaka and the two original T-Square members, Masahiro Andoh and Takeshi Itoh. Discoveries was sold with a DVD which chronicled T-Square performing and rehearsing in 2008.

In 2010, T-Square released a brand new album, Jikan Ryoko. This album was meant to showcase more of the songwriting abilities of the younger members of the group. In the summer of that same year, T-Square rerecorded some of their older songs and released them in October as an album called Takara no Uta: T-Square plays The Square.

T-Square released another album, Nine Stories, in April 2011. Some current and former T-Square members would tour with Satoshi Bandoh to promote his solo album, Happy Life!, in late 2011. T-Square recorded another T-Square plays The Square album, 夢曲 ("Yume no Uta") released in October 2011, much like the year prior. Keizoh Kawano recorded and released his own solo album, Dreams, in November. At the end of 2011, they performed a new song, "Bird of Wonder", which was released with their 2012 album Wings. The group later released another cover album in 2012, 虹曲 ("Niji no Uta"), this time employing the help of special guest musicians, such as jazz pianist Yosuke Yamashita.

35th Anniversary Festival, T-Square Super Band (2013) 
T-Square branded themselves "T-Square Super Band" for the second time, now in promotion of their 35th anniversary, T-Square's 35th Anniversary Festival. They retained all members of the Super Band from 2008, including percussionist Kiyohiko Senba. Shingo Tanaka was also promoted from a support member to an official member of the band. Upon the release of the album Smile, a picture was included in the release, reading something related to "Itoh's resignation", making fans believe that Takeshi Itoh would once again leave the band. In their last album of 2013, History, Itoh only performed on two tracks of the album, but did not leave the band.

Music streaming (2014–2017)
The T-Square's 35th Anniversary Festival show was released as a Blu-ray in May 2014. Nearly a month later, their album was released, NEXT.

The 40th T-Square album, Paradise, was released in July 2015, being one of ten T-Square albums (along with Lucky Summer Lady, Midnight Lover, Make Me a Star, Magic, Kyakusenbi no Yuuwaku, Stars and the Moon, S.P.O.R.T.S., Yes, No, and Friendship) not to be released in the spring. Paradise was the first T-Square album to be released on iTunes and Spotify in the United States, along with their following album from 2016, Treasure Hunter.

T-Square released the album REBIRTH in April 2017.

40th Anniversary Festival, lineup changes (2017–Spring 2022)

In 2017, T-Square performed two separate concerts at Blue Note Tokyo, the first one with their 1982–1985 lineup of Masahiro Andoh, Takeshi Itoh, Tohru Hasebe, Toyoyouki Tanaka, and Hirotaka Izumi with Keizoh Kawano playing backing synth. The second one included their 1987–1990 lineup of Masahiro Andoh, Takeshi Itoh, Hiroyuki Noritake, Mitsuru Sutoh, and Hirotaka Izumi with Keizoh Kawano playing backing synth.

In 2018, T-Square released two albums, City Coaster in April and It's a Wonderful Life! in November. "It's a Wonderful Life!" was also the name of their 40th anniversary concert. This particular concert included most of the usual members of a "T-Square Super Band". They also performed "Takarajima" with the Nishiarai Junior High School Brass Band Club. This concert also included Daisaku Kume, who hadn't played with T-Square since their 20th anniversary in 1998.

T-Square had planned to record their next album Horizon in Los Angeles, but on February 6, 2019, their keyboardist Keizoh Kawano was hospitalized due to an intracerebral hemorrhage which paralyzed the left side of his body. Due to the abrupt changes, the T-Square members were not free to travel to the U.S. to stay and record the album, so Philippe Saisse, who hadn't played with T-Square since 1995's T-Square and Friends, but played on Satoshi Bandoh's Step By Step album from 2016, offered to finish the keyboard parts. They managed to release Horizon in April 2019. The new formation, with Saisse replacing Kawano temporarily, was then called T-Square Alpha, indicating the name change also by adding an alpha sign to their logo, and they used this name while touring to promote Horizon in concerts.
In December 2019, Akito Shirai joined the band as their keyboardist while bassist Shingo Tanaka became a support member again.

T-Square recorded and released AI Factory to a two-month delay as a result of the COVID-19 pandemic. On August 28, 2020, it was announced that T-Square would release a new self-cover album titled Crème de la Crème, part of which includes a hand-picked collection of Keizoh Kawano's best songs. It was also announced that this would be the last time that Kawano would play on T-Square albums and live concerts, though he would continue to work as a composer.

At some point during the end of 2020, T-Square's albums released prior to 2015 became available to all streaming services.

On February 1, 2021, Masahiro Andoh announced that he would leave T-Square after releasing upcoming album and completing their 2021 tour, wishing to continue activities as a solo guitarist. Once again, without Masahiro Andoh on guitar, the other T-Square members announced they would form T-Square Alpha, likely with a new guitarist taking Andoh's spot. T-Square released the album FLY! FLY! FLY! in April 2021, which was awarded the Golden Disc Award 2022 for the instrumental album of the year by the Recording Industry Association of Japan (RIAJ).

On April 26, 2021, Hirotaka Izumi died suddenly due to acute heart failure. Accordingly, T-Square (under the Classic Lineup of Itoh, Andoh, Noritake, Sutoh, plus Keizoh Kawano and Yudai Satoh on synthesizers), performed concerts of mostly Izumi-penned T-Square songs.

On April 1, 2022, it was announced that T-Square's 49th Album, WISH, would be released on May 18, though, by this Point, the Website shows only Takeshi Itoh and Satoshi Bandoh in photoshoots, confirming that both are the only official members of T-Square. This album also marks the first time in close to 25 years that Masato Honda and Keiji Matsumoto perform with T-Square, albeit only recording Studio Parts and not fully integrated into the band.

T-Square Alpha X and 45th Anniversary (Summer 2022-Present)
Masato Honda and Takahiro Miyazaki performed together in July 2022. With T-Square's "Year End" Shows in December 2022, Masato Honda performed with the current T-Square Lineup, herein referred to as T-Square Alpha X.

On January 18, 2023, Sony Music Japan released a digital album of their Live Concert from December 31st 2021.

The T-Square Alpha X Lineup is set to perform another Hirotaka Izumi memorial concert in April 2023.

Members
 Takeshi Itoh – Saxophone, EWI (1977–1990, 2000–present)
 Satoshi Bandoh – drums (2004–present)

Support Members
 Shingo Tanaka – bass (2005–present; full member 2013–2019)
 Akito Shirai – keyboards (2019–present)
 Yuma Hara - guitars (2022–present)
 Masato Honda - Saxophone, EWI (support member 2022-Present, full member 1991-1997)

Guitar
Masahiro Andoh (1976–2000, 2000–2021)
The founding guitarist, main composer and leader of T-Square. He is one of three guitarists (alongside Casiopea guitarist Issei Noro and guitarist Hirokuni Korekata) in the supergroup Ottottrio and has also been well known for songs such as "Moon Over the Castle" in the Gran Turismo series. Briefly disbanded the group shortly after the release of their self-titled album, as he initially left the band and wanted to find a new guitarist to continue the band's activities, but returned with saxophonist Takeshi Itoh later that year. He left the band in 2021 after the release of the album Fly, Fly, Fly!
Yuhji Mikuriya (1978–1979)
Appeared in the band's debut albums Lucky Summer Lady and  Midnight Lover in 1978. He also formed a guitar duo with Masahiro Andoh called anmi2.
Yuma Hara (October 2021 – Present, Support Member)
A guitarist with only 2 solo studio albums to his name, but also an Arranger for several J-Pop artists, Yuma Hara began performing with T-Square alpha at a concert at Blue Note in Tokyo on October 23, 2021. His first album alongside T-Square is their 2022 album "Wish".

Saxophone/EWI
Takeshi Itoh (1977–1990, 2000–present)
T-Square's original and best known saxophonist, as well as the second-longest running member of the band overall. He left the group at the end of 1990 to pursue his solo career and returned to the group in late 2000, starting with the album Friendship and has been the saxophonist ever since.
Masato Honda (1991–1997 as Full-Time member, 2022-Present as Support Member)
The second saxophonist of T-Square. He first recorded with the band in 1990 and was welcomed in the original Farewell & Welcome concert in early 1991, replacing Takeshi Itoh and making many appearances with the band in that time. He is best known for songs like Megalith, Little League Star, Traffic Jam, Summer Mirage (Natsu no Shinkirou), Bad Moon, Samurai Metropolis, etc. He left T-Square after the release of Blue in Red in 1997 to begin his solo career as well, and has not yet appeared in any other reunion after the 20th anniversary concert. After leaving, he would work with musicians such as bassist Tomohito Aoki, Eric Miyashiro, Jun Kajiwara, etc., and form Voice of Elements with former T-Square members Keiji Matsumoto, Mitsuru Sutoh, and Hiroyuki Noritake. Masato contributed brass arrangements and recorded Saxophone parts (and even recorded trading solos with his predecessor, Itoh, on the title track, "As You Wish") for T-Square's 2022 Album, "WISH", 24 years after leaving the band. Honda returned as a member of the newly renamed T-Square Alpha X after a run of "Welcome Back" concerts in December 2022.
Takahiro Miyazaki (1998–2000)
The band's third saxophonist, being welcomed alongside Tadashi Namba in the second Farewell & Welcome concert in 1998 as one of the replacements of Masato Honda and keyboardist Hirotaka Izumi. He appeared as the sole leading saxophonist in the studio album Gravity in 1998, Sweet & Gentle in 1999, and finally, their self-titled album T-SQUARE in early 2000. However, he has recorded with and contributed compositions and arrangements for the band since his departure, including work on albums T COMES BACK in 2003 and Smile in 2013. Furthermore, he has appeared in all anniversary concerts since the 20th anniversary performance (being the first overall) in 1998.

Bass

Yuhji Nakamura (1976–1980)
The Square's original bassist since 1976. He appeared in the first four albums and was replaced by Toyoyuki Tanaka in 1981.
Toyoyuki Tanaka (1981–1986)
First appeared in the studio album Magic and replaced Yuhji Nakamura, being one of the members to give the band a more rock-esque sound, as well as composing songs such as Rodan, Between, Stingray, Stimulator, and Overhead Kick. He left the band after the release of S.P.O.R.T.S. in 1986.
Mitsuru Sutoh (1986–2000, 2003–2004 and onward as an Occasional Support Member)
The first long-term bassist of T-Square. He joined the group at the end of 1986 and debuted in one of their most famous albums, Truth in 1987. He composed songs such as "Nab That Chap", "Dooba Wooba" (alongside Hiroyuki Noritake), "Sunnyside Cruise", "Pioggia Di Capri", "From the Bottom of My Heart", "Explorer", "Ms. Bracing", "Scrambling", "Our Fortress", and "An Evening Glow". He left after the group disbanded in 2000, and returned for the band's 25th anniversary in 2003 with Hirotaka Izumi. He also formed the band TRIX alongside former Casiopea drummer Noriaki Kumagai.
Kiyoshi Murakami (2000–2001, Support Member)
One of the session bassists during the unit era. He appeared in the album Friendship in 2000 and the live performances that same year and in early 2001.
Shunsuke "Xenon" Ishigawa (2002–2003)
Joined the band as a session bassist in 2002 until Mitsuru Sutoh's temporary return.
Katsuji Morioka (2004—2005)
First appeared in the Year-End performance in 2003, the studio album Groove Globe in 2004, and their crossover performance with other Fusion band DIMENSION that same year. He also appeared in the studio version of Passion Flower in 2005.
Shingo Tanaka (2005—2012 and 2019–present as Support Member, 2013-2019 as Official Member)
Debuted with T-Square during their live performance of the album Passion Flower in 2005 as a "Special Support" member. He is the band's second long-term bassist and became an official member in 2013.

Drums
Shunichi Harada (1976–1977)
Played during The Square's earliest stages. He left the band shortly after to work in other jazz-related groups.
Michael S. Kawai (1977–1979)
The replacement of Shunichi Harada. He appeared in the band's first three studio albums, and has worked with T-Square after, returning as a percussionist from 2004 to 2008.
Jun Aoyama (1980–1981) († 12.3.2013)
Replaced Michael Kawai and joined at the end of 1979, appearing in the album Rockoon released in 1980. He was best known as Tatsuro Yamashita's drummer from 1979 to 2003.
Eiji Shimizu (1981–1982)
Joined the band alongside bassist Toyoyuki Tanaka in 1981, replacing Aoyama on Drums in the album Magic. He would leave the band with keyboardist Daisaku Kume in mid-1982.
Tohru Hasebe (1982–1985 and after as Occasional Support)
First appeared in the album Temptation of Shapely Legs and was T-Square's first consistent drummer since Kawai's departure in 1979, as well as being a part of the first fixed line-up. He left The Square in late 1985, but is one of many past members who have appeared in multiple reunion concerts. He was previously in another band prior to joining The Square, known as ANKH that lasted from 1980 to 1982.
Hiroyuki Noritake (1986–2000, 2000–2004 and after as Occasional Support)
Joined the group at the end of 1985 and officially replaced Tohru Hasebe on Drums in 1986. He is T-Square's second-longest tenured drummer (for 14 years as an official member and, subsequently, as a Support Member for 4), also being a co-composer of the track Dooba Wooba! from the album Wave in 1989, with his first individual composition of the band being No More Tears from Natsu no Wakusei in 1994. He has also composed tracks such as One Step Beyond, Yuh-Ja, Tooi Taiko, Eurostar etc. He became a "Special Support" member during the band's return in late 2000. He would leave T-Square in mid-2004 after nearly 20 years with the band. Following the Casiopea vs. The Square concert in 2003, he also formed a drummer duo with current Casiopea drummer Akira Jimbo in 2005 known as Synchronized DNA (which would also collaborate with Casiopea that same year).
Satoshi Bandoh (2004–present) 
T-Square's current and longest-tenured drummer (with 18 years as an official member of T-Square), he joined the band in the summer of 2004, following Hiroyuki Noritake's departure. Aside from T-Square, he has maintained a solo career with 2 albums to his name, he has appeared as a Support drummer for Dimension albums, and has also contributed to some famous video game soundtracks, with Mario Kart 8 and Gran Turismo 5, 6 and 7 as examples.

Keyboards
Jun Hakamazuka (1976–1977)
The band's pianist during the formation. He left the group and became a professional jazz pianist.
Junko Miyagi (1977–1979)
Replaced Jun Hakamazuka on keyboards in 1977 and has also worked in the band's first three studio albums, also leaving in 1979. Her role was briefly filled by keyboardist and songwriter Izumi Kobayashi in mid-1979 only.
Shiro Sagisu (1978–1979)
Was a Support Keyboardist in The Square's first studio albums. He left between early and mid-1979 and went on to write 2,000-plus Songs, TV/Advertisement Jingles and Incidental Music for Films and Anime series, most notably, Kimagure Orange Road and Neon Genesis Evangelion.
Daisaku Kume (1980–1982)
Previously part of Prism, he joined at the end of 1979 as the official replacement of Junko Miyagi. His first studio appearance with The Square was in 1980. He left in 1982, but would appear in the 20th Anniversary concert in 1998, as well as the 40th Anniversary concert in 2018.
Hirotaka Izumi (1982–1997, 2003–2004 and onward as Occasional Support-Member) († 4.26.2021)
Replaced Daisaku Kume and joined at the same time as Tohru Hasebe. He was the first long-term keyboardist and one of the most well-known keyboardists of the band. He composed many songs during his run, with examples consisting of Omens of Love, Forgotten Saga, Takarajima, Cape Light, Cry for the Moon, Twilight in Upper West, etc. He was also one of the two remaining members from the earlier years of the band alongside Masahiro Andoh from 1991 to his departure from the band in 1997. Despite his official departure in 1997, He would sometimes be called in as a Support Member for T-Square Anniversary/Classic Lineup Reunion concerts for the 2000s and 2010s until his death due to acute heart failure on April 26, 2021.
In addition to playing Piano, Izumi originally handled Auxiliary Synthesizer work (Brass Parts, String Parts, sometimes even going as far as to actually help write parts for Brass and String Sections in the Studio Version of their songs), but since 1997, expressed a want to simply play piano.
T-Square hosted a Memorial Concert in April 2022 with the setlist mainly consisting of Izumi songs as a show of respect for his tenure in the band, punctuated by his Classically inclined, Jazz & Pop-friendly style of songwriting that has become a trademark of not only his own sound but that of The Square in the 1980s and 90s.
Tadashi Namba (1998)
Joined the band to fill the keyboardist role in 1998 after Hirotaka Izumi left. He would appear in Farewell & Welcome Live 1998, Gravity, and the 20th anniversary reunion. He left T-Square a few months later.
Keiji Matsumoto (1999–2000, 2021-Present as "Special Support")
Joined T-Square at the end of 1998 and replaced Tadashi Namba as a support member. He first appeared in Sweet & Gentle in 1999 and became an official member of T-Square in their self-titled album. He left the group after its dissolution to work as a session pianist. Notably, he has recorded and performed with the likes of Masato Honda, Masayoshi Takanaka and The Super Mario Players. In December 2021, Matsumoto made a full return to T-Square as a Support Member, marking his first activities with the band since the album T COMES BACK in 2003.

Keizoh Kawano (2000–2003, 2020-Onward (as "Special Support"), 2004–2020)
Being the longest-tenured keyboardist after Izumi's departure (with 4 years as a Support Member and 16 years as an official keyboardist), Kawano joined in late 2000 as an auxiliary keyboardist as a result of his predecessor, Hirotaka Izumi deciding to play piano and leave all Auxiliary Synth work to someone else. Kawano became the main keyboardist of T-Square in 2004, a role he held for 15 years until he became hospitalized with a stroke in 2019, leaving him unable to use the left side of his body. His role was filled by keyboardist Philippe Saisse, Yudai Satoh, and Akito Shirai. He became a Support Member once again in the album A.I. Factory and Creme de la Creme was his last appearance as a keyboardist. He does, however, plan to continue to contribute to some of the compositions for T-Square's future music.
Philippe Saisse (1995, 2019, Support Member)
He performed on the T-Square and Friends "Miss You In New York" album in 1995, and replaced Keizoh Kawano during his medical recovery. This was during the 2019 Tour supporting their "Horizon" Album. In addition, he performed on T-Square drummer Satoshi Bandoh's "Step By Step!" album in 2016.
Akito Shirai (2019–present, Support Member)
T-Square's current keyboardist. He joined in December 2019, and first appeared in the album A.I. Factory in 2020 to play main keyboards for Keizoh Kawano during his recovery, but became his official replacement in October 2020.
Yudai Satoh (Support Keyboardist, 2019–Present)
Before performing with T-Square itself, Yudai Satoh performed with Hirotaka Izumi, Kiyoshi Murakami and Masami Itagaki in 2008, for Izumi's "Live 0801" Concert Video. Little more than a decade later, Yudai Satoh performed on their Live Tour to promote their 2019 Album Horizon. He also appeared in one of Masahiro Andoh's "Farewell Tour" performances alongside T-Square, with his first Studio Recording in T-Square being 2022's "WISH".

Percussion
Kiyohiko Senba (1978–1981)
The Square's original percussionist. He was an official member since the group's debut up to Rockoon in 1980. However, he would continue to work in most future albums as a "Special Support" member.

Timeline

Offshoot bands

AnMi2/AnMitsuru
AnMi2, named after Anmitsu, are a guitar duo comprising the first two guitarists of T-Square, Masahiro Andoh and Yuhji Mikuriya. Shortly after Masahiro Andoh left T-Square, the duo performed with fellow ex-T-Square Bassist Mitsuru Sutoh and was renamed "AnMitsuru".

Trio The Square/The Masato Honda Band/Voice of Elements

This trio first appeared in the T-Square albums Sweet & Gentle in 1999 and T-SQUARE in 2000 with keyboardist Keiji Matsumoto, drummer Hiroyuki Noritake and bassist Mitsuru Sutoh as Trio The Square. They became a standalone group around the time Andoh initially left T-Square, resulting in the dissolution of the band form. Trio The Square disbanded in later 2000.

Later on that year, Hiroyuki Noritake and Keiji Matsumoto, along with bassist Tomohito Aoki and guitarist Jun Kajiwara, would become the backing band of former T-Square saxophonist, Masato Honda. The group didn't have an official name, but it was collectively dubbed by fans as "The Masato Honda Band".

The backing band was put on hold in 2005, then fully deactivated in early mid-2006 to make way for Voice of Elements, which also featured Hiroyuki Noritake and Keiji Matsumoto. Tomohito Aoki, the original bassist of the group, died of acute heart failure on June that year, and he was replaced by Mitsuru Sutoh. As of Sutoh joining the group, everyone who ever joined it was also a previous member of T-Square. Voice of Elements, as the band was called when they returned in 2006, continued performing and recording through 2007. Both Keiji Matsumoto and Masato Honda are credited as guest performers on the 2022 T-Square album, "WISH".

Ottottrio
This group was a fusion supergroup led by 3 guitarists: T-Square's Masahiro Andoh, Casiopea's Issei Noro and KORENOS' Hirokuni Korekata. Along with Masahiro Andoh, Drummer Hiroyuki Noritake was another T-Square musician who was part of this group since 1988. Also, T-Square bassist Mitsuru Sutoh and keyboardist Keiji Matsumoto (who would join T-Square a few months later) recorded with them at the end of 1998.

KoreNoS & Rocket Jam
Stylized as KoreNoS, this band was formed in 2004 by Hirokuni Korekata, Hiroyuki Noritake and Mitsuru Sutoh. They released two studio albums, "Asian Street Style" (2004) and "Abracadabra" (2005).  They also released a live album in 2007. Hirokuni Korekata also created a new band with bassist Shingo Tanaka and drummer Satoshi Bandoh in 2021.

Casiopea vs. The Square
Although "Casiopea vs. The Square" was performed as a one-off event in 2003 (the DVD and the CD have different audio sources, suggesting that there may have been 2 shows), this extension of 2 different jazz fusion bands goes back to 1989. All members of T-Square, Casiopea, and Ottottrio played in The Super Fusion in 1989 and Kiyohiko Senba, former percussionist of The Square, played on one of the songs from Casiopea's 1993 album, "Dramatic". A year later, both groups played an arrangement of The Beatles' "Get Back" on a Japanese Broadcast. 3 years after that, Casiopea, T-Square and Jimsaku played at Tokyo Jam 1997, with the same song. In 2003, both groups played (with some of the players replaced) at the event called Casiopea vs. The Square. Both groups still have somewhat of an alliance, seeing as Casiopea's 1993 – 1997 drummer, Noriaki Kumagai and former T-Square bassist, Mitsuru Sutoh are both in TRIX. And Sax player Takeshi Itoh performed with Casiopea's Keyboardist, Minoru Mukaiya in 2006.

Synchronized DNA
Drummers Hiroyuki Noritake of T-Square and Akira Jimbo of Casiopea formed a duo in 2003, after the "Casiopea vs. The Square" concert. They were later featured in Casiopea's 2005 album Signal, the aforementioned band's last album before their hiatus the year after.

Pyramid
A group that features pianist Hirotaka Izumi, Casiopea drummer Akira Jimbo and guitarist Yuji Toriyama, along with other studio musicians. They have released four studio albums.

Akasaka Trio
Guitarist Masahiro Andoh, Drummer Hiroyuki Noritake and Bassist Mitsuru Sutoh, all former T-Square members, formed the Akasaka Trio in 2022, following Andoh's exit from T-Square.

As support members for other artists
After the dissolution of Trio the Square, Mitsuru Sutoh and Keiji Matsumoto would later become backing musicians for Japanese a cappella pop group, 'The Gospellers'. Sutoh also plays for TRIX (since that band's formation in 2004). Noriaki Kumagai (Casiopea drummer from 1993 – 1996) is also a notable member.

Drummer Hiroyuki Noritake, keyboardist Keizoh Kawano, and bassist Ko Shimizu (from Naniwa Express) would record as support members for Japanese fusion/rock guitarist Kumi Adachi in 2007–2008.

T-Square's current bassist Shingo Tanaka is a former part of The 39's/The Thank You's (39 in Japanese can be pronounced as san kyū, which resembles Thank You). The 39's were a band that accompanied concerts performed by Vocaloids, specifically the "39's Giving Day" concert series (it being another pun, this time on "Thanksgiving Day"), although the concerts themselves wouldn't necessarily be held on said day. During the final 39's Giving Day Concert in March, 2012, the band were also accompanied by Takahiro Miyazaki.

Discography
Lucky Summer Lady (1978)
Midnight Lover (1978)
Make Me A Star (1979)
Japanese Soul Brothers (1979) (NHK broadcast) 
Rockoon (1980)
Magic (1981)
Jungle Strut (1982)
Temptation of Shapely Legs (脚線美の誘惑 Kyakusenbi no Yuhwaku) (1982)
The Water of the Rainbow (うち水に Rainbow/Uchi Mizu ni Rainbow) (1983)
Adventures (1984)
The Square - Concert Live - "Adventures" (1984)
Stars and the Moon (1984)
R.E.S.O.R.T. (1985)
The Square Live (Vinyl/CD) (1985) 
This was recorded from June 21–24, 1985, while a separate video under the same name was recorded shortly after on July 2.
The Square Live (VHS/LaserDisc) (1985)
Final Release with Tohru Hasebe on Drums
S.P.O.R.T.S. (1986)
First Album with Hiroyuki Noritake on Drums
Final Album with Toyoyuki Tanaka on Bass
Truth (1987)
First Album with Mitsuru Sutoh on Bass
Yes, No (1988)
Live in New York (1988)
Wave (1989)
Live At Roxy (1989)
Natural (1990)
T-Square Live - Featuring F-1 Grand Prix Theme (1990)
Although this is Masato Honda's first appearance with T-Square, he isn't considered yet a Leading Saxophonist.
T-Square Live - "Natural" (1990)
The Final Album with Takeshi Itoh as Leading Saxophonist, at least at the time
New-S (1991)
The First Album with Masato Honda as Leading Saxophonist
T-Square Live - Farewell & Welcome (1991)
Refreshest (1991) (as T-Square and Friends)
Impressive (1992)
F-1 Grand Prix World (1992)
Human (1993)
Summer Planet (夏の惑星 Natsu no Wakusei) (1994)
SOLITUDE -Dedicated to Senna- (1994) (as T-Square and Friends)
Welcome to the Rose Garden (1995 (as T-Square)
Miss you in New York (1995, as T-Square and Friends)
T-Square and Friends Live in Tokyo (1995) (VHS release) (as T-Square and Friends)
B.C.A.D. (1996)
Blue in Red (1997)
The Final Album with Masato Honda as Leading Saxophonist
Final Album with Hirotaka Izumi on keyboards
Gravity (1998)
The First Album with Takahiro Miyazaki as Leading Saxophonist
20th Anniversary Performance at Yaon de Asobu (1998)
 Farewell & Welcome Live 1998 (1998)
Sweet and Gentle (1999)
T-Square (2000)
The Cover Art of this album is a Brick Wall, setting the tone for a possible break-up to this band.
The Final Album with Takahiro Miyazaki as Leading Saxophonist.
Trio The Square was formed after this album. The trio was composed of Mitsuru Sutoh, Hiroyuki Noritake and Keiji Matsumoto.
Masahiro Andoh, the band's only member who hadn't left his role since 1976, believed the band has reached its limit and couldn't go much farther. He composed more music which became the next album.
Friendship (2000)
Takeshi Itoh returns as Leading Saxophonist for the first time since 1990. At this point, only he and Andoh are considered T-Square members, and much of the album consists of Session Players. 
Friendship (Live) (2001)
Truth 21c (2001) (as T-Square Plus)
Brasil (2001)
New Road, Old Way (2002)
Vocal2 (or Vocal Square) (2002) (as T-Square and Friends)
Spirits (2003 as The Square)
T Comes Back (2003)
Groove Globe (2004)
Final Album with Hiroyuki Noritake on Drums
Passion Flower (2005)
First Album with Satoshi Bandoh on Drums
Blood Music (2006)
33 (2007)
Wonderful Days (2008, as T-Square Super Band)
Concert Tour 2008 Final Wonderful Days (2008, DVD)
The Square ~ T-Square Since 1978 30th Anniversary (2009) (as T-Square Super Special Band) (DVD and Blu-ray)
Discoveries (2009) (as T-Square)
Time Travel (時間旅行 Jikan Ryoko) (2010)
Treasured Songs – T-Square plays The Square (宝曲 [たからのうた] Takara no Uta – T-Square plays The Square) (2010)
Nine Stories (2011)
Music Dream – T-Square plays The Square (夢曲 (ゆめのうた) Yume Kyoku (Yume no Uta) – T-Square plays The Square) (2011)
Wings (2012)
Rainbow Songs – T-Square plays T- and The Square Special (虹曲 Niji Kyoku – T-Square plays T- and The Square Special) (2012)
Smile (2013) (as T-Square Super Band)
History (2013) (as T-Square Plus)
T-Square 35th Anniversary 'Festival''' (filmed in 2013, released 2014)NEXT (2014)Dolphin Through (2015)Paradise (2015)Treasure Hunter (2016)Year End Live 20151219-24 Best Take Complete Selection (2016)REBIRTH (2017)CITY COASTER (2018)It's a Wonderful Life (2018)40th Anniversary Celebration Concert “It’s a Wonderful Life!” Complete Edition (2018)HORIZON (2019)AI Factory (2020)
First Album with Akiro Shirai on KeyboardsCreme de la Creme (2020)FLY! FLY! FLY! (2021)
Final Album with Keizoh Kawano on Keyboards
Final Album with Masahiro Andoh, the longest-Tenured T-Square guitarist since 1976.WISH'' (2022)
First T-Square Album to include Masato Honda in 24 Years.
First T-Square Album to include Keiji Matsumoto in 22 Years.
First T-Square Album with Yuma Hara on Guitar.

References

External links 

 T-Square Information Fan's Page
Tohru Hasebe Official Website

Columbia Records artists
Japanese jazz ensembles
Jazz fusion ensembles
Musical groups established in 1978
Musical groups from Tokyo